Fernando Poe is the name of:
Fernando Poe Sr. (1916–1951), Filipino actor
Fernando Poe Jr. (1939–2004), Filipino actor, film director, and politician
Fernando Poe II (1943–1995), Filipino actor

See also
Fernando Po (disambiguation)